The Tapiola Sinfonietta (founded 1987) is a city orchestra of Espoo, Finland. The orchestra consists of 41 members and its principal concert venue is Tapiola Hall (with 773 seats) at the Espoo Cultural Centre.

At the beginning Jorma Panula, Osmo Vänskä, Juhani Lamminmäki and Jean-Jacques Kantorow (the honorary conductor) have served as principal conductors. Nowadays, the orchestra does not have a principal conductor. Instead, they have an artistic board consisting of the general manager and two musicians elected by the orchestra.

Tapiola Sinfonietta records and tours regularly and has currently more than 60 titles.

Selected recordings

 Nicolas Bacri : Sturm und Drang, conducted by Jean-Jacques Kantorow,  BIS 2009
 Carl Maria von Weber : Symphonies, Works for Bassoon & Orchestra, conducted by Jean-Jacques Kantorow, BIS 2009
 Ludwig van Beethoven : Complete Piano Concertos  Olli Mustonen, piano and conductor , Ondine 2020
 Camille Saint-Saëns : Complete Piano concertos, Rhapsodie d’Auvergne, Africa, Wedding Cake, Allegro appassionato, Alexandre Kantorow, piano, conducted by Jean-Jacques Kantorow. 2 SACD BIS 2021/2022. Diapason d’or

See also
 Tapiola Choir

References

External links
 Official website in English

Tapiola
Sinfoniettas (orchestras)
Finnish orchestras
1987 establishments in Finland
Musical groups established in 1987